General Tinio, officially the Municipality of General Tinio (Ilocano: Ili ti Heneral Tinio), is a 1st class municipality in the province of Nueva Ecija, Philippines. According to the 2020 census, it has a population of 55,925 people.

It was known as Papaya until 1957.

The town is at the foot of the Sierra Madre Mountains, adjoining the Fort Magsaysay Army Reservation on the northeastern side.

History
According to the story passed on from one generation to another, the town got its name because of miscommunication between the natives and the Spanish colonizers.  A native settler when asked by a Spanish soldier "Llama el pueblo?" replied "Papaya" referring to the particular fruit tree growing abundantly in the place (not understanding the Spanish language).  The name stuck to the Spanish colonizers and the place from then on was called "Papaya".

Papaya was a sitio of Bo. Mapisong which was then a barrio of Gapan. Bo. Mapisong became a town in 1851 changing its name to Peñaranda after a Spanish engineer Jose Maria Peñaranda.  Papaya became one of its barangays.  Papaya became a town on January 1, 1921, through the collaborative efforts of Capitan Mamerto Padolina who was then the Secretary of the Governor of the Province, Judge Segundo Bernardo and Francisco Padolina.

Congressman Celestino Juan sponsored a congressional act changing the name of Papaya to General Tinio in honor of General Manuel Tinio, a noble and prominent revolutionary leader against the Spaniards who hailed from the Nueva Ecija. The act was signed into law on June 20, 1957, as Republic Act No. 1665. The new name of the town was inaugurated days later, on August 19, 1957.

Recently, the municipal council approved a resolution to rename the town back to its original name, "Papaya".

Geography

Barangays
General Tinio is politically subdivided into 13 barangays consisting of:

 Padolina         (Barangay 1)
 Concepcion        (Barangay 2)
 Rio Chico         (Barangay 3)
 Pias              (Barangay 4)
 Nazareth          (Barangay 5)
 Bago              (Barangay 6)
 Poblacion West    (Barangay 7)
 Poblacion Central (Barangay 8)
 San Pedro         (Barangay 9)
 Sampaguita        (Barangay 10)
 Poblacion East    (Barangay 11)
 Pulong Matong     (Barangay 12)
 Palale            (Barangay 13)

Climate

Demographics

Economy 

Farming is the livelihood of majority of the residents.  Even though located at the foot of the Sierra Madre Mountain Ridges, the topography is generally plain ideal to agricultural products such as palay and vegetables.  A number of poultry broiler contract growers are located in the municipality.  Other industries include furniture and fixtures, backyard poultry, cattle and livestock, vegetable production and minor agricultural livelihoods like duck raising.  "Ikmo" or betel leaves production is one dying symbol of the town.  The practice of chewing betel leaves by the older generation was not adopted by the younger generation even though of its reported natural anti-cancer formula.

The remittances of numerous sons and daughters of Papaya abroad also help keep the economy of the town afloat.  Papayanos can be relied to answer calls of assistance for the town's development.

Minalungao National Park is also one of the biggest attraction of the town catering tens and hundreds of thousands each day.

Government
The following have led the town from its birth in 1921 to what it had become today.

Culture
Roman Catholic is the most prevalent religion, with Iglesia ni Cristo, IEMELIF, Baptist, Methodist, and others attracting its own followers.  The town's patron saint, the Santo Cristo or the Holy Cross is being feted every May.

The town is best known for having the most number of brass bands in the Philippines with 15 organized bands.  These bands are sought after to enhance entertainment ambience in fiestas and other traditional rites such as wakes.  The Family band is the most popular one and have produced champions in majorette exhibition, solo flute competition, solo clarinet competition, solo trumpet competition, French horn competition, etc., in national brass band competitions.

The town also has other places of interest notably Minalungao National Park which is a favorite swimming destinations in summer, specially during Black Saturday when it is usually filled with local bathers and visitors.  Minalungao, literally meaning "mine of gold in a cave", has several caves which can explored.  The river also has a portion where a stone ledge located about 15 meters high from the river can be used as spring board.

Papaya Festival is also celebrated coincide with its Foundation Anniversary, Parade of different school students around the town wearing colourful costume inspired by the fruits Papaya which this town got its name until it was change to General Tinio

Gallery

See also
List of renamed cities and municipalities in the Philippines

References

External links

 [ Philippine Standard Geographic Code]
Philippine Census Information

Municipalities of Nueva Ecija